Precita Creek is a small creek in the Bernal Heights and Mission District neighborhoods of San Francisco, California. Its course is mirrored by the current Precita Avenue, which ran along the creek when it was laid out sometime during the early 1850s. The creek gets its name from precita, the Spanish word meaning dam or weir. The stream was buried before the beginning of the 20th century.

Course
Starting near Market Street and 24th Street, the old stream follows Precita Avenue and Cesar Chavez Street, ending in the Islais Creek’s estuarine bog near the insection of Cesar Chavez Street and Evans Avenue.

History
Precita Avenue was laid along the creek sometime during the early 1850s. In the area now called Precita Park, a village had developed by the 1860s. The village drew its water from an upstream portion of the creek and used the creek as an open sewer.  Between the 1880s and the 1900s, Precita Creek was paved over to create Army Street (now Cesar Chavez Street).

See also
 Precita Eyes

Notes and references

See also

 List of watercourses in the San Francisco Bay Area

External links

Rivers of San Francisco